AICEP Portugal Global (Portuguese: Agência para o Investimento e Comércio Externo de Portugal) is an independent public entity of the Government of Portugal, with the goal of attracting foreign investment to Portugal and supporting the internationalization of Portuguese companies into the global economy.

With a budget upwards of hundreds of millions of Euros, AICEP is one of the strongest forces in the foreign investment field in Portugal.

Its current president is Luís Castro Henriques, who substituted Miguel Frasquilho in that position.

References

External links

Government agencies of Portugal
Economy of Portugal